Chang Jung-yeon (born 6 April 1977) is a female javelin thrower from South Korea. Her personal best throw is 60.92 metres, achieved in April 2004 in Jeonju.

Achievements

References
 

1977 births
Living people
South Korean female javelin throwers
Athletes (track and field) at the 2004 Summer Olympics
Olympic athletes of South Korea
Athletes (track and field) at the 2002 Asian Games
Asian Games competitors for South Korea